The men's ISSF 25 meter rapid fire pistol event at the 2008 Olympic Games took place on August 15 and 16 at the Beijing Shooting Range Hall. There were 19 competitors from 14 nations. The event was won by Oleksandr Petriv of Ukraine, the nation's first medal in the event. Germany took silver (Ralf Schumann) and bronze (Christian Reitz). It was Schumann's fifth and final Olympic medal in the event; with three golds and two silvers, he was individually more successful than any nation other than Germany. After rule changes, new Olympic records were established by Keith Sanderson (qualification round) and Petriv (final).

Background

This was the 23rd appearance of what had been standardised in 1948 as the men's ISSF 25 meter rapid fire pistol event, the only event on the 2020 programme that traces back to 1896. The event has been held at every Summer Olympics except 1904 and 1928 (when no shooting events were held) and 1908; it was nominally open to women from 1968 to 1980, although very few women participated these years. The first five events were quite different, with some level of consistency finally beginning with the 1932 event—which, though it had differences from the 1924 competition, was roughly similar. The 1936 competition followed the 1932 one quite closely. The post-World War II event substantially altered the competition once again. The 1984 Games introduced women's-only shooting events, including the ISSF 25 meter pistol (though this is more similar to the non-Olympic men's ISSF 25 meter center-fire pistol than the rapid fire pistol).

Two of the six finalists from 2004 returned: gold medalist (and 1992 and 1996 gold and 1988 silver medalist) Ralf Schumann of Germany and fifth-place finisher (and 2000 bronze medalist) Iulian Raicea of Romania. The 2006 world champion and runner-up were both from China: Zhang Penghui and Liu Zhongsheng. Schumann was favored once again.

The Czech Republic made its debut in the event. The United States made its 19th appearance, most of any nation.

Qualification

Each National Olympic Committee (NOC) could enter up to two shooters if the NOC earned enough quota sports or had enough crossover-qualified shooters. To compete, a shooter needed a quota spot and to achieve a Minimum Qualification Score (MQS). Once a shooter was using a quota spot in any shooting event, they could enter any other shooting event for which they had achieved the MQS as well (a crossover qualification). There were 18 quota spots used for the rapid fire pistol: 1 for the host nation, 4 at the 2006 World Cup events, 2 at the 2006 World Championship, 4 at the 2007 World Cup events, 1 each at the 2007 European Championships, 2007 Pan American Games, 2007 Oceania Championships, and 2008 Asian Championships, and 3 re-allocated places. In 2008, one crossover qualification was used in the rapid fire pistol: Júlio Almeida of Brazil had qualified and used a quota spot in the 10 metre air pistol and also achieved the rapid fire pistol MQS; he competed in both events (as well as the 50 metre pistol).

Competition format

The competition format continued to use the two-round (qualifying round and final) format, as in 1988 and since 1996, with a change to the format of the final to increase the number of shots. The 2005 rules changes also required the pistols used to be sport pistols, banning .22 Short cartridges.

The qualifying round from 1988 onward was essentially the same as the full competition format from 1948–1984. Each shooter fired 60 shots. These were done in two courses of 30; each course consisted of two stages of 15; each stage consisted of three series of 5. In each stage, the time limit for each series was 8 seconds for the first, 6 seconds for the second, and 4 seconds for the third. 

The 1988 tournament had added a two-series final for the top eight shooters; the 1992 competition broke that down to a four-series semifinal for the top eight and two-series final for the top four. In 1996 and 2000, the top eight once again advanced to the final. The 2004 version had reduced the number of finalists to six, where it stayed in 2008.

In the final, each shooter fired four five-shot series at 4 seconds. Scoring in the final was to 1/10 of a point, with each shot worth up to 10.9 points (for a final round maximum of 218, and total maximum of 818).

The 1992 competition had introduced round targets rather than the silhouettes used from 1948 to 1988 as well as many pre-World War II versions of the event. Score, rather than hits, had been used as the primary ranking method since 1960.

Records

Prior to this competition, the existing world and Olympic records were as follows.

Schedule

Results

Qualifying

The first stage began at 13:00 China Standard Time (UTC+8) on Friday. The second stage began at 09:00 on Saturday.

Final

References

Shooting at the 2008 Summer Olympics
Men's 2008
Men's events at the 2008 Summer Olympics